Hans Peter Christian Hansen (29 December 1851 – 10 July 1910) was a New Zealand farmer, hotel-keeper and community leader. He was born in Assens, Denmark on 29 December 1851.

References

1851 births
1910 deaths
New Zealand farmers
People from Assens Municipality
Danish emigrants to New Zealand
New Zealand hoteliers